Time Exposure is the thirteenth studio album by American jazz fusion bassist Stanley Clarke, released on August 28, 1984 by Epic Records. The album features musical assistance from Jeff Beck, George Duke, Howard Hewett and Ernie Watts, amongst others.

The album was digitally remastered in 2013 by Funky Town Grooves and included five bonus tracks.

Critical reception

In a retrospective review for AllMusic, critic Richard S. Ginell wrote that "The sheer speed and power of Clarke's electric and piccolo bass work is astonishing throughout the album, and the CD as a whole has a techno sound and edge reflecting a period of time just before analog synthesizers were swept away by digital instruments."

Track listing
All tracks composed by Stanley Clarke; except where indicated.

Side one
 "Play the Bass 103" – 0:46
 "Are You Ready (For the Future)" (Clarke, Denzil Miller) – 3:15
 "Speedball" – 3:12
 "Heaven Sent You" (Denzil Miller, Howard Hewett) – 6:00
 "Time Exposure" – 4:48

Side two
"Future Shock" (Clarke, Darryl Phinnessee, Howard Smith) – 4:31
 "Future" (Clarke, Louis Johnson) – 4:03
 "Spacerunner" – 3:14
 "I Know Just How You Feel" – 5:57

Bonus tracks on 2013 Funky Town Grooves remaster
"Heaven Sent You" (12" Mix) – 5:57
 "Heaven Sent You" (7" Mix) – 3:26
 "Are You Ready (For the Future)" (12" Mix) – 4:02
 "Speedball (12" Mix)" – 3:24
 "Future (12" Mix)" – 6:15

Personnel
Credits are adapted from the Time Exposure liner notes.
 Stanley Clarke – bass guitar; piccolo bass; tenor bass; bass box; talk box; keyboards; Korg synthesizer; drums; percussion; vocals
 Todd Cochran – keyboards; Roland Jupiter-8; Prophet-5
 George Duke – keyboards; Prophet-5
 Craig Harris – keyboards; Synclavier; vocoder; vocals
 Denzil Miller – keyboards
 Jeff Beck – guitar; talk box; guitar synthesizer
 Ray Gomez – rhythm guitar
 Greg Boyer – horn
 Bennie Cowan – horn
 Gregory Thomas – horn
 Ernie Watts – tenor saxophone
 Howard Hewett – vocals
 Louis Johnson – bass; vocals
 John Gilston – drums
 John Robinson – drums
 Jim Gilstrap – backing vocals
 Darryl Phinnessee – backing vocals
 Howard Smith – backing vocals

Production and artwork
 Stanley Clarke – producer
 Erik Zobler – engineer
 David Coleman – illustration; artwork
 Randee Saint Nicholas – photography
 Steve Schmidt – assistant engineer
 Jeff Silver – assistant engineer
 Toni Green – assistant engineer
 Donald Lane – art direction
 Brian Gardner – mastering engineer

Charts

References

External links

1984 albums
Stanley Clarke albums
Epic Records albums
Soul albums by American artists
Albums produced by Stanley Clarke